Edward Benjamin Cushing (November 22, 1862 – February 17, 1924) was an engineer and academic administrator. He served as the Chairman of the Board of Regents of Texas A&M University in 1912.

Biography

Early life
Edward Benjamin Cushing was born in Houston, Texas to E.H. and Matilda Cushing. His father was an outspoken Southern Democrat and owner of The Telegraph, a Houston newspaper. He graduated from the Agricultural and Mechanical College of Texas, now known as Texas A&M University, in 1880.

Career
He worked as a civil engineer for Southern Pacific Railroad after graduation and served in the U.S. Army. He also served as chief secretary of the Association of Ex-Cadets. He was appointed to the Board of Directors for the school in 1912, only a year before assuming its presidency.

Later, he personally bankrolled the fledgling Texas A&M University while Chairman of the Board of Regents in 1912. His money and campaign prevented a Texas A&M consolidation with the University of Texas at Austin.

Personal life
In 1888, he married Florence Abbey Powars.

In March 1904, his brother was kidnapped for ransom in West Texas and taken across the border to Mexico.

Death
He died in Houston in 1924. At the time of his death, he was a bank receiver for First National Bank in Granger, Texas.

Legacy
In 1930, a library was built at Texas A&M University in memory of Cushing. This represented the first freestanding library on the Texas A&M campus. The Sterling C. Evans Library was constructed in 1968 and became the university's primary library, but the Cushing Library remained as a repository of important university archives.

Honors and awards
 2006: Distinguished Alumni Award, Texas A&M University
 World War I: Croix de Guerre, France

References

1862 births
1924 deaths
People from Houston
Texas A&M University alumni
Texas A&M University faculty
Burials at Glenwood Cemetery (Houston, Texas)